The 1936 Kansas Jayhawks football team represented the University of Kansas in the Big Six Conference during the 1936 college football season. In their fifth season under head coach Adrian Lindsey, the Jayhawks compiled a 1–6–1 record (0–5 against conference opponents), finished in last place in the conference, and were outscored by opponents by a combined total of 153 to 35. They played their home games at Memorial Stadium in Lawrence, Kansas. Wade Green was the team captain.

Schedule

References

Kansas
Kansas Jayhawks football seasons
Kansas Jayhawks football